The 1976 Dutch Open was a men's tennis tournament staged in Hilversum, Netherlands that was part of the one star category of the 1976 Grand Prix. The tournament was played on outdoor clay courts and was held from 13 July until 19 July 1976. It was the 20th edition of the tournament. Second-seeded Balázs Taróczy won the singles title.

Finals

Singles
 Balázs Taróczy defeated  Ricardo Cano 6–7, 2–6, 6–1, 6–3, 6–4 
 It was Taróczy's first singles title of the year and the second of his career.

Doubles
 Ricardo Cano /  Belus Prajoux defeated  Wojciech Fibak /  Balázs Taróczy 6–4, 6–3

References

External links
 ITF tournament edition details

Dutch Open (tennis)
Dutch Open (tennis)
Dutch Open
Dutch Open
Dutch Open (tennis), 1976